The mao or ma'oma'o (Gymnomyza samoensis) is a passerine bird belonging to the genus Gymnomyza in the honeyeater family Meliphagidae. It is an endangered species and is endemic to the Samoan Islands.

The plumage is dark, varying from blackish on the head and breast to olive-green on the wings and body. There is a dark greenish mark under the eye. The bill is long, curved and black in an adult and yellowish in a chick or juvenile and the legs and feet are also black. Adult birds have light blue or brown eyes whilst all juveniles have a brown iris. It characteristically bobs its tail while foraging along the trunk and branches of trees.

Nests are built at varying heights in the branches of many different tree species. A single whitish brown speckled egg is laid in a simple sticky cup nest. The single chick is in the nest for approximately 1 month prior to fledging. During this time it is fed both small vertebrates, such as geckos, and insects. After leaving the nest the juvenile remains in the core breeding territory where it is fed by the female for 2–2.5 additional months. During this time it follows the female making loud begging calls.

It is a noisy bird with beautiful loud whistling and mewing calls given most often prior to dawn and around dusk. A breeding pair also do complex duets.

It is found on the islands of Upolu and Savai'i and formerly occurred also on Tutuila but is now locally extinct in the latter. It normally inhabits mountain forest but has also been recorded in scrub and coastal coconut trees. The population, which numbers between 250-999 birds, is thought to be declining. It is threatened by destruction of the forest and the spread of introduced predators such as rats.

In December 2014, the United States Fish and Wildlife Service announced the Ma‘oma‘o as a candidate for ESA protection, describing the species as "a large, dusky olive-green honeyeater native to Upolu and Savaii, Independent Samoa (Samoa), and Tutuila Island, American Samoa, but now only found in small populations on the islands of Savaii and Upolu."

Gallery

References

Pratt, H. Douglas; Bruner, Philip L. & Berrett, Delwyn G. (1987), A Field Guide to the Birds of Hawaii and the Tropical Pacific, Princeton University Press, Chichester.
Watling, Dick (2001) A Guide to the Birds of Fiji & Western Polynesia, Environmental Consultants (Fiji), Suva.

External links
Species factsheet - BirdLife International
Fact file - ARKive
"The endangered ma'oma'o - The Mao and Manumea project

Birds described in 1841
Taxa named by Jacques Bernard Hombron
Taxa named by Honoré Jacquinot
Birds of Samoa
Endemic fauna of Samoa
Gymnomyza
ESA endangered species